The 1824 Kentucky gubernatorial election was held on August 2, 1824.

Incumbent Democratic-Republican Governor John Adair was term-limited, and could not seek a second consecutive term.

Former U.S. Representative Joseph Desha defeated Christopher Tompkins and William Russell with 59.25% of the vote.

General election

Candidates
Joseph Desha, former U.S. Representative
William Russell, member of the Kentucky House of Representatives
Christopher Tompkins, former circuit judge

Desha represented the pro-relief faction and Tompkins and Russell represented the anti-relief faction.

Results

References

Notes

References

1824
Kentucky
Gubernatorial